Hospital Max Peralta is a hospital in Cartago, Costa Rica. 

It is named after Dr. Maximiliano Peralta Jimenez who graduated from Jefferson Medical College (now Sidney Kimmel Medical College, Thomas Jefferson University) in Philadelphia in 1894. It has 633 beds but often suffers from equipment shortages.

References

Hospitals in Costa Rica
Buildings and structures in Cartago, Costa Rica
Buildings and structures in Cartago Province